Frei Paulo is a municipality located in the Brazilian state of Sergipe. Its population was 15,556 (2020).

References

Municipalities in Sergipe
Populated places established in 1890